A Dog Called Ego is a German post rock band from Hamburg, Germany formed in 2006 by Christoph Stepan (guitar, vocals), Dirk Bakker (drums), Marcel Habbe (guitar, vocals) and Gregor Kaisser (bass guitar).

History 
Christoph Stepan and Gregor Kaisser had already been playing together in several musical projects when they started working on musical material for a project that carried the working title "A DOG CALLED EGO". In early 2006 they decided to record an album and asked two friends, Marcel Habbe and Dirk Bakker, to join them for a recording. The project quickly turned into a real band and the band started playing live.

In Summer they recorded their debut album "Living Seriously Damages Health" in their own studio in Hamburg and it was described as the best alternative/Post Rock album of the last years by German Rock Hard Magazine. On the Album Chris Harms the singer of the German Gothic Rock band Lord Of The Lost played Cello for the song "Something Huge".

After having played many concerts including a two-week tour through Bosnia and Herzegowina, A Dog Called Ego started writing new musical material and started recording at their own  Little Big Ears Studio in Hamburg/Germany. During the recording process Marcel Habbe left the band due to personal reasons. In May 2011 A Dog Called Ego digitally released "Happy Happy Apocalypse" the second full-length record via bandcamp, physical copies are planned. Again Chris Harms contributed some chello lines.

In summer 2012 the band released the "Don't Vote For Us"-EP and were asked by Anathema to support them on their European tour. Thereafter A Dog Called Ego locked down in their studio again to work on "Songs For Elevators" their latest album which was released on September 11, 2014.

Discography 
 2006: Living Seriously damages Health
 2011: Happy Happy Apocalypse
 2012: Don't Vote For Us
 2013: Songs For Elevators

External links 
 A Dog Called Ego official website
 Musik Terrorverlag review in German
 Whiskey Soda review in German
 Concert review with pictures
 Metal Inside review
 Rock Hard Magazine Bandpage
 Metal-District review
 Powermetal.de review

Musical groups established in 2006
German post-rock groups